The Minister for Civil Society was a position within the Department for Culture, Media and Sport in the Government of the United Kingdom. It concerned and directly supported charities, volunteering and social enterprise.

The office was established during the third Blair ministry as Minister for the Third Sector. The office was renamed to support the Big Society manifesto-committed agenda of the first and second Cameron ministries. Before the new commitments and Cabinet reshuffle on formation of the May Ministry in 2016 the Office for Civil Society supporting the Minister was part of the Cabinet Office. Some responsibilities were moved to the office of Minister for Sport and Civil Society after the 2017 general election.

List of ministers

Shadow Ministers for Civil Society

References

Politics of the United Kingdom
Cabinet Office (United Kingdom)
Civil society in the United Kingdom
 
Civil Society